Dinocyon is an extinct genus of hemicyonine bear of the Miocene epoch, endemic to Europe.

Fossil distribution
Poysbrunn site, Austria

References

Qiu Zhanziang (2006), "Dispersals of Neogene Carnivorans between Asia and North America

Hemicyonids
Miocene carnivorans
Prehistoric mammals of Europe
Fossil taxa described in 1861
Prehistoric carnivoran genera